William Joseph Nicholas (1885–1934) was an English footballer who played in the Football League for Derby County.

References

1885 births
1934 deaths
English footballers
Association football defenders
English Football League players
Staines Town F.C. players
Derby County F.C. players
Swansea City A.F.C. players
Llanelli Town A.F.C. players